Aurora Township is a township in Cloud County, Kansas, USA.  As of the 2000 census, its population was 169.

History
Aurora Township was organized in 1872.

Geography
According to the USGS, it contains two cemeteries: Princeville and Saint Peters.

References

 USGS Geographic Names Information System (GNIS)

External links
 US-Counties.com
 City-Data.com

Townships in Cloud County, Kansas
Townships in Kansas